Sophie Esterházy-Liechtenstein (Vienna, 5 September 1798 – Vienna, 27 June 1869), was an Austrian courtier. She served as Oberhofmeisterin (mistress of the Robes) to Empress Elisabeth of Austria in 1854-1862.

Early life 
Princess Sophie Marie Josepha von und zu Liechtenstein was born as third daughter of Johann I Joseph, Prince of Liechtenstein and his wife, Landgravine Josepha of Fürstenberg-Weitra.

Court life 
She was disliked by the Empress, as she was a friend and a confidante of the Empress' mother-in-law, Princess Sophie of Bavaria, and suspected to be her spy. She was also described as very strict, and her attitude toward Elisabeth was compared to a governess. She was replaced by  Pauline von Königsegg. She has been portrayed in numerous books about Elisabeth.

Personal life 
She married in Vienna, on 4 August 1817, Count Vincenz Esterházy von Galántha (Pressburg, 25 October 1787 – Eisgrub, 19 October 1835), without issue.

References
 Egon Caesar Conte Corti: Elisabeth, „die seltsame Frau“. Nach dem schriftlichen Nachlass der Kaiserin, den Tagebüchern ihrer Tochter und sonstigen unveröffentlichten Tagebüchern und Dokumenten. Weltbild Verlag, Augsburg 2003,  (früherer Titel: Sissi - Glück und Tragödie einer großen Kaiserin).

1798 births
1869 deaths
Austrian ladies-in-waiting
18th-century Liechtenstein women
19th-century Liechtenstein women
Daughters of monarchs